4 in 8, which in Catalan is called 4 de 8, is a castellers human tower with 8 levels and 4 people per level in the trunk, except for the last three levels called the top crown ( in Catalan), which, like in most other castells, consists of the pair, a bending child and the crowner. It is usually the first structure with 8 levels that groups of castellers complete.

References

External links

Castellers
Catalan folklore